The 1939 Oireachtas Cup was the first staging of the Oireachtas Cup, an annual hurling tournament played as part of the Oireachtas na Gaeilge. The tournament featured one game which was played on 5 November 1939.

Limerick won the title following a 4-4 to 2-5 defeat of Kilkenny in the final.

Result

Final

References

Oireachtas Cup